Robert Jastrow (September 7, 1925 – February 8, 2008) was an American astronomer and planetary physicist.  He was a NASA scientist, populist author and futurist.

Education 

Jastrow attended Townsend Harris High School. He also attended the summer program at Camp Rising Sun. He entered Columbia University for his undergraduate and graduate college, where he earned the BA, MA (1945), and PhD (1948) degrees in physics.

Career 

After leaving Columbia, Jastrow became an assistant professor at Yale, and then joined the Naval Research Laboratory. In 1958 he joined the newly formed National Aeronautics and Space Administration as head of its theoretical division. In 1961 he became the founding director of NASA's Goddard Institute for Space Studies and served as its director until his retirement from NASA in 1981. Concurrently he was a professor of Geophysics at Columbia University.

Jastrow was the first chairman of NASA’s Lunar Exploration Committee, which established the scientific goals for the exploration of the moon during the Apollo lunar landings. 

 
Jastrow was a public figure, prolific author and commentator on a range of topics including the space program, astronomy, earth science, and national security issues. He lectured on CBS and NBC, and his book, "Red Giants and White Dwarfs: The Evolution of Stars" was a bestseller

In 1981 Jastrow left NASA to join the faculty of Dartmouth College as professor of Earth Sciences. He left Dartmouth in 1992 to take up duties as director and chairman of the Mount Wilson Institute, managing the Mount Wilson Observatory in California. Jastrow was a member of the NASA Alumni Association. In 1984 Jastrow, together with Fred Seitz and William Nierenberg, founded the George C. Marshall Institute, an organization that assessed scientific issues affecting public policy in Washington, DC. The institute supported U. S. President Ronald Reagan's Strategic Defense Initiative ("Star Wars"), for example in Jastrow's 1985 "How to Make Nuclear Weapons Obsolete". He also became a prominent climate change denier. The George C. Marshall Institute opposed the scientific consensus on anthropogenic global warming. Jastrow acknowledged that Earth was experiencing a warming trend but claimed that the cause was likely to be natural variation. 
Jastrow served as Chairman Emeritus of the George C. Marshall Institute until his death.

Religious views 
His expressed views on creation were that although he was an "agnostic, and not a believer", it seems to him that "the curtain drawn over the mystery of creation will never be raised by human efforts, at least in the  foreseeable future" due to "the circumstances of the Big Bang-the fiery holocaust that destroyed the record of the past". With the discovery of the Big Bang, Jastrow began to hold a belief that, if there was a beginning to the universe, there was also a Creator.

In an interview with Christianity Today, Jastrow said "Astronomers now find they have painted themselves into a corner because they have proven, by their own methods, that the world began abruptly in an act of creation to which you can trace the seeds of every star, every planet, every living thing in this cosmos and on the earth.  And they have found that all this happened as a product of forces they cannot hope to discover. That there are what I or anyone would call supernatural forces at work is now, I think, a scientifically proven fact."

In his book, "God and The Astronomers" he rather humorously illustrated the quandary like this: " “For the scientist who has lived by his faith in the power of reason, the story ends like a bad dream. He has scaled the mountains of ignorance, he is about to conquer the highest peak; as he pulls himself over the final rock, he is greeted by a band of theologians who have been sitting there for centuries.”

In a 1995 panel discussion on the PBS show, Think Tank with Ben Wattenberg, Jastrow summed up his position on the apparent conflict between science and religion by saying

Awards 
 NASA Medal for Exceptional Scientific Achievement, 1968
 Arthur S. Fleming Award for Outstanding Service in the U.S. Government, 1964
 Columbia University Medal of Excellence, 1962
 Columbia Graduate Facilities Award to Distinguished Alumni
 Doctor of Science degree (honorary) from Manhattan College

Selected television appearances 
 Hosted more than 100 CBS-TV network programs on space science
 Special guest of NBC-TV with Wernher von Braun for the Apollo–Soyuz flights
 Featured guest of the Today show on the 10th anniversary of the landing on the moon

Selected publications

Books 
 Red Giants and White Dwarfs (1967), W. W. Norton & Company, 1990 3rd edition, paperback: 
 Astronomy: Fundamentals & Frontiers (1972) John Wiley & Sons, 1984 4th edition: , 1990 5th edition: 
 Until the Sun Dies (1977), W. W. Norton & Company, 
 God And The Astronomers (1978), W. W. Norton & Company, 2000 2nd edition, paperback: . The Big Bang theory and the argument from design. Second edition contains appendices with Roman Catholic and Jewish perspectives.
 The Enchanted Loom: Mind in the Universe (1981) Simon & Schuster hardcover: , Touchstone 1983 paperback: , Oxford Univ Press 1993 paperback: . The evolution of life and the development of the human mind. The title is from the 1937–38 Gifford Lectures by Charles Sherrington: "It is as if the Milky Way entered upon some cosmic dance. Swiftly the head mass becomes an enchanted loom where millions of flashing shuttles weave a dissolving pattern, always a meaningful pattern though never an abiding one; a shifting harmony of subpatterns."
 How to Make Nuclear Weapons Obsolete (1985), Little, Brown and Company hardcover: 
 Journey to the Stars: Space Exploration—Tomorrow and Beyond (1990), Transworld Publishers, Ltd hardcover: , Bantam paperback:

Periodicals 
 Various articles on astronomy and space for The New York Times, Reader's Digest, Foreign Affairs, Commentary Magazine, Atlantic Monthly, and Scientific American.

Maternal biography
Marie Jastrow, Looking Back: The American Dream Through Immigrant Eyes, 1907–1918, (1986), W. W. Norton & Company,

See also
 Merchants of Doubt

Notes

External links 

Obituary

American astronomers
1925 births
2008 deaths
Columbia University faculty
Columbia Graduate School of Arts and Sciences alumni
Columbia College (New York) alumni
Camp Rising Sun alumni
Townsend Harris High School alumni
Scientists from New York (state)
George C. Marshall Institute
American agnostics
Fellows of the American Physical Society